Elois T. Grooms (born May 20, 1953) is a former American football defensive lineman in the National Football League for the New Orleans Saints, the St. Louis Cardinals, and the Philadelphia Eagles.  He played college football at Tennessee Tech and was drafted in the third round of the 1975 NFL Draft.

1953 births
Living people
People from Tompkinsville, Kentucky
American football defensive linemen
New Orleans Saints players
Philadelphia Eagles players
St. Louis Cardinals (football) players
Tennessee Tech Golden Eagles football players
Players of American football from Kentucky